Football Club Kryvbas-2 Kryvyi Rih is a reserve team of recently reformed Kryvbas Kryvyi Rih. Before 2013 it competed as a reserve team of the original Kryvbas Kryvyi Rih.

In June 2013 Kryvbas Kryvyi Rih went bankrupt. In 2020 FC Hirnyk Kryvyi Rih switched its brand to Kryvbas and field its second team Kryvbas-2 in amateur competitions.

History
In 1993 Kryvbas entered its second team in the Ukrainian amateur competitions, but after two seasons withdrew it.

In 1998 the club entered into the professional leagues to compete in the Second League without entering the team in amateur competitions.

After 3 seasons the club moved to regional level before competing one more season in Second League. After 2004 the team was reformed into Kryvbas doubles team competing at competitions for reserves until 2013.

In 2020 the team once again returned to amateur level after reform of FC Hirnyk Kryvyi Rih that changed its name to Kryvbas.

League and cup history

Kryvbas-2 Kryvyi Rih (original)
{|class="wikitable"
|-bgcolor="#efefef"
! Season
! Div.
! Pos.
! Pl.
! W
! D
! L
! GS
! GA
! P
!Domestic Cup
!colspan=2|Europe
!Notes
|-
|align=center|1993–94
|align=center|4th
|align=center|12
|align=center|32
|align=center|10
|align=center|6
|align=center|16
|align=center|29
|align=center|46
|align=center|26
|align=center|
|align=center|
|align=center|
|align=center|
|-
|align=center|1994–95
|align=center|4th
|align=center|16
|align=center|32
|align=center|3
|align=center|2
|align=center|27
|align=center|12
|align=center|29
|align=center|11
|align=center|
|align=center|
|align=center|
|align=center|withdrew
|-
|align=center|1998-99
|align=center|3rd "B"
|align=center bgcolor=tan|3
|align=center|26
|align=center|17
|align=center|4
|align=center|5
|align=center|46
|align=center|16
|align=center|55
|align=center|Did not enter
|align=center|
|align=center|
|align=center|
|-
|align=center|1999-00
|align=center|3rd "B"
|align=center bgcolor=tan|3
|align=center|26
|align=center|16
|align=center|3
|align=center|7
|align=center|55
|align=center|28
|align=center|51
|align=center|1/16 finals Second League Cup
|align=center|
|align=center|
|align=center|
|-
|align=center|2000-01
|align=center|3rd "B"
|align=center|15
|align=center|28
|align=center|6
|align=center|3
|align=center|19
|align=center|28
|align=center|20
|align=center|21
|align=center|
|align=center|
|align=center|
|align=center|Club withdrawn
|-
|align=center|2002-03
|align=center colspan=13|Club competes at regional level
|-
|align=center|2003-04
|align=center|3rd "B"
|align=center|12
|align=center|30
|align=center|10
|align=center|6
|align=center|14
|align=center|33
|align=center|44
|align=center|36
|align=center|
|align=center|
|align=center|
|align=center|Club moves to Reserve competition
|}

Kryvbas-2 Kryvyi Rih (reformed)

See also
FC Kryvbas Kryvyi Rih
FC Hirnyk Kryvyi Rih

References

External links
Official website

FC Kryvbas Kryvyi Rih
Kryvbas-2 Kryvyi Rih, FC
1993 establishments in Ukraine